Noël Pinot (born in Angers, December 9, 1747 - died in Angers, 21 February 1794) was a refractory priest who was guillotined during the War in the Vendée. He was beatified by the Catholic Church and considered a martyr.

Biography  
Born the last of sixteen children to a humble weaver, he lost his father when he was eight years old.  He entered the seminary in Angers.  He was ordained a priest on 22 December 1770.

He was first appointed vicar in Bousse in 1772 and then chaplain at Angers in August 1781. In September 1789 he became pastor of Le Louroux-Béconnais commune.

During the French Revolution, he refused to take the oath of the Civil Constitution of the Clergy unlike his superior, Mathurin Garanger who took the oath on Sunday, 23 January 1791 and was later a member of the Petite Église. He was accused by the revolutionary municipality of "engaging in ecclesiastical activities to oppose the law". On Sunday 27 February, he was brought before the court.

Denounced, he was arrested on 5 March and sentenced to banishment by the District Court. He hid in Beaupreau. Returning to Louroux in 1793, during the War of Vendée, he went into hiding after the failure of the royalist insurgents against Nantes.

He was arrested on the night of 8 February 1794 during a clandestine Mass he was celebrating at the farm of Milandrie at Louroux-Béconnais, where he was hiding.  He was taken to Angers, appeared before the Commission militaire révolutionnaire and was guillotined on 3 Ventôse An II of the French Republican Calendar at the Plâce du Ralliement in Angers.

He was executed wearing the vestments he was wearing at the time of his arrest. As he mounted the scaffold, he began reciting the opening prayers of the Mass, including Introibo ad altare Dei (from Psalm 42). A statue at the Cathedral of Angers represents the first step of climbing the "altar of God".

Veneration
On 26 August 1864, Guillaume Angebault, Bishop of Angers recommended Father Brouillet to the commission to "proceed with the canonical investigation into the life and virtues of the priest".

He was beatified by Pope Pius XI in October 1926. Ninety-nine Martyrs d'Angers were beatified by Pope John Paul II on 19 February 1984. His feast day is celebrated on 21 February.

See also 
 Persecution of Catholics
 Anti-Catholics
 Dechristianization of France during the French Revolution

References 

1747 births
1794 deaths
French clergy killed in the French Revolution
French beatified people
18th-century French Roman Catholic priests
Persecution of Christians
People executed by guillotine during the French Revolution
War in the Vendée